The 2018 Suzhou Ladies Open was a professional tennis tournament played on outdoor hard courts. It was the seventh edition of the tournament and was part of the 2018 ITF Women's Circuit. It took place in Suzhou, China, on 15–21 October 2018.

Singles main draw entrants

Seeds 

 1 Rankings as of 8 October 2018.

Other entrants 
The following players received a wildcard into the singles main draw:
  Ren Jiaqi
  Yang Zhaoxuan
  Yuan Yi
  Zhang Kailin

The following players received entry from the qualifying draw:
  Fatma Al-Nabhani
  Jana Čepelová
  Gabriela Dabrowski
  Peangtarn Plipuech

The following players received entry as a lucky loser:
  Jiang Xinyu
  Haruka Kaji

Champions

Singles

 Zheng Saisai def.  Jana Čepelová, 7–5, 6–1

Doubles

 Misaki Doi /  Nao Hibino def.  Luksika Kumkhum /  Peangtarn Plipuech, 6–2, 6–3

External links 
 2018 Suzhou Ladies Open at ITFtennis.com

2018 ITF Women's Circuit
2018 in Chinese tennis
2018